Manila International Airport station (also known as MIA station) is an under-construction Manila Light Rail Transit (LRT) station situated on Line 1. It is a part of the Line 1 South Extension Project. As the name implies, this station is planned to connect Line 1 to Ninoy Aquino International Airport. However, it will not directly connect Line 1 to the airport. The station would be built in Parañaque.

History
The extension will have 8 passenger stations with an option for 2 future stations (Manuyo Uno and Talaba). The project was first approved on August 25, 2000, and the implementing agreement for the project was approved on January 22, 2002. However, construction for the extension was repeatedly delayed until the project was shelved years later.

The plans for the southern extension project were restarted as early as 2012 during the Aquino administration and was expected to begin construction in 2014, but was delayed due to right of way issues. The issues were resolved in 2016 and the project broke ground on May 4, 2017. Meanwhile, construction works on the south extension began on May 7, 2019, after the right-of-way acquisitions were cleared.

, the project is 75.3% complete. The extension is slated for partial operations by September 2024 and full operations by second quarter of 2027.

See also
List of Manila LRT and MRT stations
Manila Light Rail Transit System

References

Manila Light Rail Transit System stations
Airport railway stations
Proposed railway stations in the Philippines